Justin Gunnar Walter Chancellor (born 19 November 1971) is an English musician best known as the bass player for progressive metal band Tool since 1995. He was also the bassist of the band Peach. After settling in the US, along with his engagement in his musical projects, he and his wife Shelee Dykman Chancellor ran a store called Lobal Orning in Topanga, California, dedicated to music and literature "that shaped and changed" both of them. The store closed in 2008. He started M.T.Void music project with Piotr "Glaca" Mohammed from Sweet Noise.

Early life
Chancellor is of English and Norwegian descent. He was educated at Tonbridge School in Kent, England, where he was the bass player for a school band named Slice of Life and used to perform a cover version of Corey Hart's "Sunglasses at Night" in the dining room of his boarding house. The band released an eponymous titled tape featuring a song of the same name. Chancellor went on to study at Durham University.

Chancellor later joined the band Peach. Peach released the album Giving Birth to a Stone and two EPs, and supported Tool in 1994 in Europe before breaking up in 1995. In September that year, Chancellor moved to the United States and joined Tool full-time to replace Paul D'Amour who departed during or after the recording of the band's second full-length album. Chancellor has been a full member of the band since the 1996 studio album Ænima.

Equipment

Basses 

 Wal – Chancellor’s main bass is a Wal MKII 4-string he bought on a friend’s recommendation during the recording of Ænima. The bass’s woods and electronics help create the midrange cut and punch for which he is known. Justin also has three other four-string Wals. Justin normally plays Ernie Ball Hybrid Slinky strings (.045, .065, .085, .110) 
 Music Man Stingray – Used on "Forty-Six & 2", "H.", "Pushit" and "No Quarter".
 Gibson Thunderbird – Used once for "Prison Sex" live in 1995/1996, when he first joined the band.
 Warwick Streamer - As of 2017, Justin has his own custom shop Streamer Stage II bass.

Amplification 
Gallien-Krueger 2001RB head x3 (1 Dirty, 1 Clean, 1 Spare)
Mesa Boogie Roadready 4x12 (For Dirty)
Mesa Boogie Roadready 8x10 (For Clean)
Demeter Amplification VTBP-201S Bass Preamp running direct to PA
Formerly used
Mesa Boogie M-2000 head
Mesa Boogie M-Pulse
Mesa Boogie Bass 400+
Mesa Roadready 8x10 (in place of the 4x12)

Effects 
Boss TU-2
Guyatone VTX Tremolo
DigiTech Bass Whammy – Used on "Eulogy" (fifth up/sixth up harmony), "Pushit (Live)" (fifth up/octave up harmony), "Third Eye" (octave up), "Schism" (octave up), "Ticks and Leeches" (fifth up/octave up harmony), "Lateralus" (octave up), "Disposition" (fifth up/octave up harmony), "Vicarious" (octave up harmony), "The Pot" (octave up), "Right in Two"(fifth up/sixth up harmony), and "Invincible" (octave up).
Tech 21 SansAmp GT2 Distortion
Boss CE-5 Chorus Ensemble
Boss BF-2 Flanger
Boss DD-3 Digital Delay
MXR Bass Envelope Filter
Prescription Electronics Rx Overdriver
Colorsound Tone Bender Fuzz
Foxx Fuzz/Wah/Volume-Volume Pot Removed 
Dunlop Justin Chancellor Cry Baby Wah

Guest appearances
Chancellor played bass on the Isis song "Altered Course" on their 2004 album Panopticon. Chancellor also provided additional sounds/bass guitar on the Isis song "Weight" from their 2006 live Clearing the Eye [DVD].
Additional bass on the title track of Intronaut's 2010 album Valley of Smoke.
In October 2012, Chancellor featured as bass player on the song "In the Spirit Of..." on a The Fusion Syndicate album, released by Cleopatra Records. His track also appears on the 2014 album The Prog Box.
Chancellor narrated on the Primus track "The Valley" from their 2017 album The Desaturating Seven.
In May 2018, Chancellor collaborated with Death Grips in the album Year of the Snitch, providing bass on the track "Disappointed".
Chancellor played bass on Author and Punisher's album 2022 Krüller'', on the track "Centurion".

References

External links
 

Alternative metal musicians
Alternative metal bass guitarists
Progressive metal bass guitarists
Tool (band) members
1970 births
Living people
English heavy metal bass guitarists
English rock bass guitarists
British heavy metal bass guitarists
British rock bass guitarists
Male bass guitarists
English people of Norwegian descent
British people of Norwegian descent
People educated at Tonbridge School
Alumni of Durham University
Musicians from London
People from Topanga, California
English expatriates in the United States
21st-century English bass guitarists